Fidelis Morgan (born 8 August 1952) is an English actress and writer. She has acted with the Royal Shakespeare Company, the National Theatre, in repertory in various British cities and in the West End transfer of Noël Coward's The Vortex.

She has written stage plays based on the novels Pamela and Hangover Square. Her non-fiction writing includes The Female Wits, the first study of female playwrights of the Restoration stage and biographies of women from the 17th and 18th centuries including Charlotte Charke. Her novels include the Countess Ashby dela Zouche series of historical crime mysteries including The Rival Queens.

Life and career
Morgan was born in a gypsy caravan that stood in a corner of the grounds of the ancient Abbey of Amesbury, halfway between Stonehenge and Woodhenge. Her parents were displaced Liverpudlians, and her father found work as a dentist in Amesbury; her mother was a painter.  Morgan's family moved several times when she was a child, but she was brought up mostly in Liverpool.  She studied at the Birmingham University, receiving a degree there in the Department of Drama and Theatre Arts.

Acting

As an actress, Morgan appeared on stage with the Royal Shakespeare Company, the National Theatre, repertory in Liverpool, Birmingham, Nottingham and Leeds as well as spending many years as a regular company member of the Glasgow Citizens Theatre including playing the role of Clara Hibbert at Citizens Theatre, and in the West End transfer, of Noël Coward's The Vortex.

On television, she has been seen in As Time Goes By, Jeeves and Wooster, Dead Gorgeous and Mr Majeika. She has also directed a number of theatre productions including at some of the United Kingdom's most prestigious drama schools. 

She was nominated Best Actress of the Year 1984 in the 30 December 1984 edition of The Observer for her work at Glasgow's Citizens' Theatre.

She returned to Glasgow's Citizens' Theatre in October 2011 for "An Audience with Celia Imrie" as the host.

Novels and non-fiction
Morgan's novels include the Countess Ashby dela Zouche series of historical crime mysteries: Unnatural Fire (2000), The Rival Queens  (2001), The Ambitious Stepmother (2002) and Fortune's Slave  (2004). The Rival Queens was nominated for a Lefty Award for "the most humorous mystery novels published in the U.S. in 2002" by Left Coast Crime, California, in 2003.  Her non-fiction work includes The Female Wits, the first study of female playwrights of the Restoration stage and biographies of charismatic female figures from the 17th and 18th centuries including Charlotte Charke.

Plays and teleplays
Morgan's stage plays include adaptations of famous novels, Samuel Richardson's Pamela and Patrick Hamilton's Hangover Square (Lyric Hammersmith, 1990, and the Finborough Theatre, London, in 2008).  For her work on Pamela for Shared Experience, Morgan was nominated Most Promising Playwright in Plays and Players (1985).  She collaborated with Lynda La Plante on Channel 4's Killer Net.

Bibliography

Non-fiction
 The Female Wits, Virago] (1981)
 A Woman of No Character, Faber (1986)
 Bluff Your Way in Theatre, Ravette (1986)
 The Well Known Trouble-maker, Faber (1988)
 A Misogynist's Source Book, Jonathan Cape (1989)
 Women Playwrights Of The Restoration, Dent Everyman (1991)
 The Female Tatler, Dent Everyman (1992)
 The Years Between, Virago (1994)
 Wicked!, Virago (1996)
 Like a Charm (Century) collaboration with other crime writers and edited by Karen Slaughter (2004)

Fiction
 My Dark Rosaleen Heinemann (1994)
 Unnatural Fire HarperCollins (2000)
 The Rival Queens HarperCollins (2001)
 The Ambitious Stepmother HarperCollins (2002)
 Fortune’s Slave HarperCollins (2004)

Short stories
 "The Actress & The Thief", BBC Radio 4, 1995
 "The Creep", Image Magazine (Eire), October 1995
 "Dead At The Wheel", Magazine of Architectural Symposium Pontresina, 2001
 "Down and Dirty", Like A Charm by Karin Slaughter (ed.) (Century, February 2004)
 Contributions to Encyclopedia of British Women's Writing 1900-1950 (Palgrave Macmillan, 2006

Plays
 Pamela with Giles Havergal 1985
 Hangover Square 1990
 Fragments From the Life of Marie Antoinette 1996

References

External links
 

1952 births
English stage actresses
English television actresses
English dramatists and playwrights
English crime fiction writers
Living people
Politicians from Liverpool